Jose Chatruc (born 9 November 1976) is an Argentine football midfielder.  He is of Ukrainian descent.

Chatruc made his league debut on 11 March 1996 for Platense in a 1-0 defeat to Lanús. In 1999, he joined Racing Club where he has played over 100 games in his two spells with the club. He was part of the championship winning team in Apertura 2001.

Chatruc has played outside Argentina for Grasshoppers of Switzerland and Barcelona Sporting Club of Ecuador. He has also played for a number of other clubs in Argentina including San Lorenzo, Estudiantes, Quilmes and Banfield. In 2007, he rejoined Racing for a second stint with the club.

In 2009, he joined Tiro Federal of the Argentine 2nd division.

Honours

Team
Racing Club de Avellaneda:
Argentine League: 2001 Apertura
San Lorenzo:
Copa Sudamericana: 2002
Grasshopper (Switzerland):
Swiss Super League: 2002–03 Nationalliga A

References

External links
Statistics at Irish Times
 Racing Club Official Player Profile
 Argentine Primera statistics

1976 births
Living people
Argentine footballers
Association football midfielders
Club Atlético Platense footballers
Racing Club de Avellaneda footballers
San Lorenzo de Almagro footballers
Estudiantes de La Plata footballers
Quilmes Atlético Club footballers
Club Atlético Banfield footballers
Tiro Federal footballers
Grasshopper Club Zürich players
Barcelona S.C. footballers
Argentine Primera División players
Swiss Super League players
Argentine expatriate footballers
Expatriate footballers in Ecuador
Expatriate footballers in Switzerland
Argentine people of Ukrainian descent
Footballers from Buenos Aires